Tournament of Champions may refer to:

Sports

Golf 
 Tournament of Champions (golf), a PGA Tour event
 Tournament of Champs, a 1969 LPGA Tour (women's) tournament

Tennis 
 ATP Champions Tour, an international men's tennis circuit for retired pros
 WTA Tournament of Champions, a women's tennis event for champions of WTA International tournaments
 Tournament of Champions (tennis), a major professional tennis tournament from 1957 to 1959
 Jack Kramer Tournament of Champions, the name of the Wembley Championships in 1968
 WCT Tournament of Champions, a men's tennis tournament that was held on the WCT Tour from 1977 to 1990

Other sports 
 PBA Tournament of Champions, one of the four major bowling tournaments on the PBA Tour
 Tournament of Champions (NJSIAA), a high school tournament in New Jersey to determine overall #1 state ranking for each sport
 Tournament of Champions (squash), an international squash tournament held in New York City

Television 
 Jeopardy! Tournament of Champions, a tournament of past major winners in the game show Jeopardy!
 Tournament of Champions (TV series), a Food Network competition series hosted by Guy Fieri

Other uses 
 World Series of Poker Tournament of Champions, a World Series of Poker invitational tournament
World Series of Poker: Tournament of Champions, a 2006 tie-in video game based on the tournament
 Tournament of Champions (debate), a United States high school debate tournament
 Escape Room: Tournament of Champions, an American horror film

See also

 
 
 Tournament (disambiguation)
 Champion (disambiguation)